Sunnyside is a city-center neighborhood in Denver, Colorado, located in the Northside of Denver, west of Interstate 25.

The neighborhood is bounded by Union Pacific Railroad lines on the east, Interstate 70 on the north, Federal Boulevard on the West and 38th Avenue on the south. It is bordered by the Highland neighborhood on the south and the Chaffee Park neighborhood on the north.

The neighborhood has a community group named Sunnyside United Neighbors, Inc (SUNI).

References

External links
 Sunnyside United Neighbors Inc (SUNI)

Neighborhoods in Denver